Uruzgan (Dari), also spelled as Urozgan or Oruzgan, is one of the thirty-four provinces of Afghanistan. Uruzgan is located in the center of the country. The population is 436,079, and the province is mostly a tribal society. Tarinkot serves as the capital of the province.

In 2004, the new Daykundi Province was carved out of an area in the north. Uruzgan borders the provinces of Kandahar, Daykundi, Ghazni, Zabul, and Helmand.

Geography

Uruzgan province is located in southern Afghanistan, bordering Zabul and Kandahar to the south, Helmand to the southwest, Daykundi to the north, and Ghazni to the east. Much of the province is mountainous or semi-mountainous terrain, while the rest of the area is made up of flat land.

History

The Arabs were first to arrive in Uruzgan in the 7th century when they brought Islam to the region followed by the Saffarids who conquered the place in the 9th century . The region was part of ancient Arachosia, and was ruled by the Medes before it fell to the Achaemenids. In 330 BC, Alexander the Great occupied the area but left it to the Seleucids to rule. It was later attained and ruled by the Mauryas under Ashoka.  By the 7th century, when the Arabs first arrived, it was under the control of the Zunbils before being conquered in the name of Islam by the Saffarids in the 9th century. It fell to the Ghaznavids followed by the Ghurids before the Mongol invasion in the 13th century. The area was ruled by Arghun Khan of Ilkhanate, later by the Timurids, Mughals and Safavids. 

In 1709, the Hotak dynasty rose to power in Kandahar and defeated the Safavids. Then, he took control of the entire southern Afghanistan while most of the Durrani Pashtuns were settled in the Herat area at the time.  In 1747, one of Nader Shah's commanders, Ahmad Shah Durrani, became leader of the Afghans and the region of Uruzgan was one of the first to become part of his new Durrani Empire, which became what is now the modern state of Afghanistan. 

During the 1980s Soviet war in Afghanistan, Uruzgan witnessed fighting between pro-Soviet forces and the Mujahideen. One of the most prominent local Mujahideen leaders was Jan Mohammad Khan. In late 1994, Uruzgan was captured by the Taliban.  They were toppled by US-led forces in late 2001. Hamid Karzai and his followers arrived in Uruzgan between October and November 2001 to take over control of the area.

Recent history

In June 2002 a wedding party in Uruzgan was mistakenly bombed by the U.S. Air Force, which resulted in the death of 30 civilians. In the wake of the fall of the Taliban — from January 2002 through March 2006 — the province was governed by Jan Mohammad Khan, a warlord ally of Afghan President Karzai, and a member of the same Popalzai Pashtun tribe. In March 2006 Karzai appointed Maulavi Abdul Hakim Munib, a former Taliban official who had reconciled with the Government of Afghanistan, to replace Jan Mohammad Khan.

In the summer of 2006 insurgents in Uruzgan were targeted by a NATO-Afghan military offensive called Operation Mountain Thrust. In September 2007 President Karzai removed Munib, who had become increasingly ineffective.

In August 2006, the NATO-led International Security Assistance Force (ISAF) assumed authority for Uruzgan from the US-led coalition, as the Netherlands took command of the Provincial Reconstruction Team (PRT) from the US as Task Force Uruzgan. There is also an Australian element under the Dutch command.

Because of security concerns and the Taliban insurgency, only one international aid agency (GIZ) has a permanent presence in Uruzgan. NATO's ISAF operates a PRT in Tarinkot. The 1,400 Dutch and 1,090 Australian troops in the area secured only the largest population centers in Uruzgan (Deh Rawood, Chora, and Tarinkot towns) under the Dutch "inkspot policy". However, the force's area of responsibility included the entire province. Gizab district, which was then the most dangerous of Uruzgan's district, had no ISAF presence before. In August 2010, the 1,950 Dutch forces withdrew their forces from Uruzgan province, after a political disagreement in the Dutch parliament, leaving the PRT to the US and Australia to continue the mission.

Uruzgan's opium poppy crop reached record levels in 2006 and 2007, according to the United Nations Office on Drugs and Crime (UNODC), as no significant eradication efforts were carried out by the Afghan administration or Dutch forces.

From 15 to 19 June 2007 Dutch, American, Australian and Afghan soldiers defended the town of Chora against an assault by Taliban combatants. Reports in the Dutch, Australian and US press indicated that the battle was one of the largest Taliban offensives of the year. The fighting resulted in the deaths of a Dutch soldier, 1 Australian soldier, 1 American soldier, 16 Afghan policemen, an unknown number of civilians and a large number of Taliban.

In September 2008 Rozi Khan, the leader of Uruzgan's Pashtun Barakzai tribe, and a longtime rival of Popalzai leader Jan Mohammed Khan, was killed in a firefight in Chora District.

Gizab District was temporarily cleared of the Taliban by ISAF forces in late April 2010 and attributed to help from the uprising of the townspeople.

In February 2010, near Khod, over ten civilians in a three-vehicle convoy were killed by a combined force of a Lockheed AC-130, Bell OH-58 Kiowa helicopters and General Atomics MQ-1 Predator drones, who misidentified them as Taliban. The air forces were attempting to protect ground troops fighting several km away.

Transportation
As of May 2014 the province was served by Tarinkot Airport which had regularly scheduled direct passenger service to Kabul.

Healthcare
The percentage of households with clean drinking water increased from 8% in 2005 to 27% in 2011.
The percentage of births attended to by a skilled birth attendant increased from 6% in 2005 to 14% in 2011.

Education
The overall literacy rate (6+ years of age) increased from 5% in 2005 to 17% in 2011.
The overall net enrollment rate (6–13 years of age) increased from 1% in 2005 to 49% in 2011.

Demographics

As of 2020, the total population of the province is about 436,079. The province has an estimated 45,000 households, each with about six members on average. A large portion of Uruzgan's settled population belongs to ethnic Pashtuns and ethnic Hazaras. There is also a small population of Kuchi nomads, whose numbers vary with the seasons.

Population figures are from the Ministry of Rural Rehabilitation and Development, the Central Statistics Office Afghanistan, and the Liaison Office study 2009.

People of Uruzgan have a reputation for being conservative or "backward".

Districts

See also
Provinces of Afghanistan

References

Hazarajat
Provinces of Afghanistan